Tada mandal is one of the 46 mandals in Tirupati district of the state of Andhra Pradesh, India. Its headquarters are located at Tada. The mandal is situated on the coast of Bay of Bengal, bounded by Sullurpeta mandal of Tirupati district of Andhra Pradesh and also borders the state of Tamil Nadu.

Biodiversity 
Tada mandal has brackish water ecosystem. Every year, terrestrial and aquatic birds migrate to Pulicat Lake area for a temporary stay. The ecosystem covers an area of  including parts of the mandal along with Chittamur, Doravarisatram, Sullurpeta and Vakadu mandals. The terrestrial birds include painted storks, large egrets, little egrets, grey pelicans, grey herons; water birds include northern pintails, black-winged stilts, northern shovelers, common teal, seagulls, terns, sandpipers, and common coots.

Demographics 

 census, the mandal had a population of 46,468. The total population constitute, 23,309 males and 23,159 females —a sex ratio of 994 females per 1000 males. 5,201 children are in the age group of 0–6 years, of which 2,608 are boys and 2,593 are girls —a ratio of 994 per 1000. The average literacy rate stands at 64.74% with 26,714 literates.

Towns and villages 

Tada Khandrika is the most populated and Pallepalem is the least populated settlement in the mandal.  census, the mandal has 40 settlements. They are as follows:

See also 
Tirupati district

References

Mandals in Nellore district